Clementino Rodrigues (14 November 1921 – 30 March 2020) was a Brazilian samba composer and singer.

Discography
Mundão de Ouro, Selo Comando S Discos, CD (2013)
Riachão, Selo Caravelas, CD (2001)
Humanenochum, Selo Caravelas, CD (2000)
Samba da Bahia, Selo Fontana, LP (1975)
Sonho de Malandro, Selo Desenbanco, LP (1973)
Umbigada da Baleia, 78 (por volta da década de 1960)

References

1921 births
2020 deaths
20th-century Brazilian male singers
20th-century Brazilian singers
Afro-Brazilian male singers
Brazilian composers